Dido Fontana is an Italian photographer.

Life and work
Fontana was born in Mezzolombardo, Trentino-Alto Adige/Südtirol in the North of Italy, and spent much of his childhood in his father's darkroom.

His work might appear spontaneous, however, every detail is carefully planned.

Fontana has collaborated with magazines and web zines such as Ginza, Playboy, and Tissue. In 2014, one of his photos was exhibited at the Minneapolis Institute of Arts show The Art of Murder.

Books

 Didocentrico. Self-published/Blurb, 2010.
 Perverdido
 The Personal Trainer 3. Edition of 200 copies.
 The Personal Trainer 4. Edition of 200 copies.
 The Personal Trainer 5. Edition of 200 copies with Golab Agency-Milano, 2019.

References

External links

Energie9
Blink Magazine
Enquire
Foto&Video Magazine_ru
Elisabetta Rossi article in  Itali@Magazine
The Art of Murder

Year of birth missing (living people)
Living people
Italian photographers
Fashion photographers